Caldecote (pronounced ") is a tiny hamlet in the civil parish of Moulsoe in the City of Milton Keynes, Buckinghamshire, England.

History 
The place name is fairly common in England and comes from an Old English term meaning "cold cottage", referring to a resting place for travellers or other strangers on the road.  The original Northampton to London road (modern B526) runs nearby. The route was diverted in 1728 along a new road on the higher ground east of the village, causing the latter to decline.

Caldecote was recorded in the Domesday Book as Caldecote.

The place name was once used elsewhere in Buckinghamshire in the ancient village adjacent to Bedgrove.

Location 
The modern area is the triangle defined by the M1 motorway, the A422 road and the A509 road.  It is mostly farmland and designated as urban open space since it is substantially within the flood plain of the River Ouzel (or Lovat).

See also 
There is also another ancient village (and now a modern development and balancing lake) in Milton Keynes with a very similar name of Caldecotte.

References

External links
 
 

Hamlets in Buckinghamshire
Areas of Milton Keynes